Zhao Linquan (born 1 April 1987) is a male Chinese rower. He competed for Team China at the 2008 Summer Olympics.

References

External links

1987 births
Living people
Chinese male rowers
Olympic rowers of China
Rowers at the 2008 Summer Olympics
Place of birth missing (living people)
21st-century Chinese people